Hugh Lamb may refer to:

 Hugh Lamb (c. 1850–1903), businessman with the architecture firm of Lamb and Rich
 Hugh L. Lamb (1890–1959), American bishop in the Roman Catholic Church